The 1878 Cheviot by-election was a by-election held on 21 May 1878 during the 6th New Zealand Parliament in the electorate of  in Canterbury.

The by-election was caused by the resignation of the incumbent MP Leonard Harper on 2 April 1878.
  
The by-election was won by Alfred Saunders.

Results
The following table gives the election result:

Notes

Cheviot 1878
1878 elections in New Zealand
May 1878 events
Politics of Canterbury, New Zealand